Dean Pleasants (born May 18, 1965) is an American guitarist. He has been the lead guitarist for Suicidal Tendencies since 1996, and is their longest-standing lead guitarist, surpassing Rocky George, who had been in the band for 11 years. He is also a member of the Suicidal Tendencies funk metal side project Infectious Grooves. He also played with Ugly Kid Joe on their America's Least Wanted album. He also played with George Clinton, Tone Loc, Coke advertisements, Poe, Jody Watley and Atlantic Starr. Dean currently endorses Schecter guitars, having also used Fernandes and ESP guitars in the past. For amplification he has used VHT, Fender and Marshall amps.

References 

1965 births
African-American guitarists
African-American rock musicians
American heavy metal guitarists
American male guitarists
Guitarists from Texas
Living people
Musicians from San Antonio
People from San Antonio
Suicidal Tendencies members
20th-century American guitarists